Chhota Jagulia is a village and a gram panchayat in the Barasat I Block - 1 in the Barasat Sadar subdivision of the North 24 Parganas district in the state of West Bengal, India. It is around 7 km from Barasat.

Geography

Location
Chhota Jagulia is ocated at 

Towns/ villages in Chhota Jagulia gram panchayat are:Bahera, Bamangachhi, Bara, Bazitpur, Chhota Jagulia, Kulberia, Maliakur, Malikapur, Mandalganti, Murali, Sikdeshpukhuria and Tentulia.

Area overview
The area covered in the map alongside is largely a part of the north Bidyadhari Plain. located in the lower Ganges Delta. The country is flat. It is a little raised above flood level and the highest ground borders the river channels. 54.67% of the people of the densely populated area lives in the urban areas and 45.33% lives in the rural  areas.

Note: The map alongside presents some of the notable locations in the subdivision. All places marked in the map are linked in the larger full screen map.

Civic administration

CD block HQ
The headquarters of Barasat I CD block are located at Chhota Jagulia.

Demographics
According to the 2011 Census of India, Chhota Jagulia had a total population of 4,043, of which 2,087 (52%) were males and 1,956 (48%) were females. Population in the age range 0–6 years was 279. The total number of literate persons in Chhota Jagulia was 3,208 (87.67% of the population over 6 years).

Transport
Chhota Jagulia is located off NH 35 (Jessore Road).

Education
Chhota Jagulia High School, a Bengali medium co-educational higher secondary school was established in 1847. It is one of the oldest school in Bengal and has arrangements for teaching from class V to XII.

Healthcare
Chhota Jagulia block primary health centre with 15 beds is the main medical facility in Barasat I CD block. There are primary health centres at Kadambagachi (with 10 beds) and Duttapukur (with 6 beds).

See also
Map of Barasat I CD Block on Page 393 of District Census Handbook.

References

Villages in North 24 Parganas district